This is the discography of Dave Lombardo, a Cuban American drummer and a co-founding member of the American thrash metal band Slayer.

Discography

with Fantômas

with Grip Inc.

with John Zorn

as Dave Lombardo

with Slayer

Heavy metal discographies

Discographies of American artists
Discographies of Cuban artists